Histopathology of dermatitis can be performed in uncertain cases of inflammatory skin condition that remain uncertain after history and physical examination.

Sampling
Generally a skin biopsy:
For punch biopsies, a size of 4 mm is preferred for most inflammatory dermatoses.
Panniculitis or cutaneous lymphoproliferative disorders: 6 mm punch biopsy or skin excision.
A superficial or shave biopsy is regarded as insufficient.

Fixation
Generally: Buffered 4% formaldehyde.
In suspected immunologic disease: Fixation for immunofluorescence, with for example Michel's solution. For details, see immunofluorescense of skin tissues

Staining
Generally 3 sections for H&E staining and one section with periodic acid Schiff (PAS)
If suspected bacterial and fungal microorganisms, consider Gram stain and Gomori methenamine silver stain.

Microscopic evaluation
One approach is to classify into mainly either of the following, primarily based on depth of involvement:
Epidermis, papillary dermis, and superficial vascular plexus:
Vesiculobullous lesions
Pustular dermatosis
Non vesicullobullous, non-pustular
With epidermal changes
Without epidermal changes. These characteristically have a superficial perivascular inflammatory infiltrate, and can be classified by type of cell infiltrate:
Lymphocytic (most common)
Lymphoeosinophilic
Lymphoplasmacytic
Mast cell
Lymphohistiocytic
Neutrophilic
Continue in corresponding section:

Non vesicullobullous, non-pustular lesions with epidermal changes

Spongiotic dermatitis
It is characterized by epithelial intercellular edema. 

In addition to above, an unspecific spongiotic dermatitis can be consistent with nummular dermatitis, dyshidrotic dermatitis, Id reaction, dermatophytosis, miliaria, Gianotti-Crosti syndrome and pityriasis rosea.

Interface dermatitis
These are sorted into either:
Interface dermatitis with vacuolar change
Interface dermatitis with lichenoid inflammation

Interface dermatitis with vacuolar change

An interface dermatitis with vacuolar alteration, not otherwise specified, may be caused by viral exanthems, phototoxic dermatitis, acute radiation dermatitis, erythema dyschromicum perstans, lupus erythematosus and dermatomyositis.

Interface dermatitis with lichenoid inflammation

Interface dermatitis with lichenoid inflammation, not otherwise specified, can be caused by lichen planus-like keratosis, lichenoid actinic keratosis,  lichenoid lupus erythematosus, lichenoid GVHD (chronic GVHD), pigmented purpuric dermatosis, pityriasis rosea, and pityriasis lichenoides chronica. Unusual conditions that can be associated with a lichenoid inflammatory cell infiltrate are HIV dermatitis, syphilis, mycosis fungoides, urticaria pigmentosa, and post-inflammatory hyperpigmentation. In cases of post-inflammatory hyperpigmentation, it is important to exclude potentially harmful mimics such as a regressed melanocytic lesion or lichenoid pigmented actinic keratosis.

Psoriaform dermatitis
Examining multiple deeper levels is recommended if initial cuts do not correlate well with the clinical history.

Psoriaform dermatitis typically displays:
Regular epidermal hyperplasia, elongation of the rete ridges, hyperkeratosis, and parakeratosis. 
Usually:A superficial perivascular inflammatory infiltrate
Often: Thinning of epidermal cells overlying the tips of dermal papillae (suprapapillary plates), and dilated, tortuous blood vessels within these papillae

Further histopathologic diagnosis is performed by the following parameters:

Non vesicullobullous, non-pustular lesions without epidermal changes

Lymphocytic infiltrate

Lymphoeosinophilic infiltrate

Lymphoplasmacytic infiltrate

Mastocytosis

Lymphohistiocytic infiltrate

These include bacterial infections including leprosy, and the sample should therefore be stained with Ziel-Neelsen, acid fast stains, Gomori methenamine silver, PAS, and Fite stains. If negative, an unspecific lymphohistocytic dermatosis may be caused by drug reactions and viral infections.

Neutrophilic infiltrate

Multinucleated giant cells

Foreign bodies indicate a foreign body granuloma.
Specific forms of multinucleated giant cells include the Touton giant cell, which contains a ring of nuclei surrounding a central homogeneous cytoplasm, with foamy cytoplasm surrounding the nuclei. The central cytoplasm (surrounded by the nuclei) may be both amphophilic and eosinophilic.

Notes

References

Dermatitis
Histopathology